Yangsan Fault is a seismic fault in southeastern Korea which was responsible for the 5.7 Mw Gyeongju earthquake in 2016. It is located between Yeongdeok County and Busan with Yangsan.

References

Seismic faults of South Korea